Dave & Sugar was a pop-styled American country music trio which enjoyed its peak success in the mid- to late-1970s. The trio consisted of lead singer Dave Rowland and initially on backing vocals, Vicki Hackeman and Jackie Frantz. Over time, the female members ("Sugar") of the group changed: Frantz was replaced by Sue Powell in 1977, who in turn was replaced by Jamie Kaye in 1980, while Hackeman was replaced by Melissa Dean (Etta Britt) in January 1979. Overall, Dave & Sugar charted 16 times on the Billboard country charts, including three No. 1 hits: "The Door Is Always Open", "Tear Time" and "Golden Tears". Powell also had two chart singles outside the group.

Background
The trio was founded and fronted by Dave Rowland, born in Sanger, California, raised in Los Angeles, California (January 26, 1944 – November 1, 2018), while two female vocalists made up the "Sugar" part. The "Sugar" line-up changed several times during the group's run of success, while the two original singers were Jackie Frantz and Vicki Hackeman.

Before forming Dave & Sugar, Rowland was part of J.D. Sumner and the Stamps Quartet (who was touring with Elvis Presley at the time), and later the Four Guys. He also was a prominent member of country singer Charley Pride's road show. By 1975, with Pride looking for a backup band, Rowland hired Frantz and Hackeman, and Dave & Sugar was formed. They signed a deal with RCA Records.

The trio's first single, "Queen of the Silver Dollar" (written by Shel Silverstein, and originally recorded by Dr. Hook in 1972, and also included on Emmylou Harris' debut solo album earlier in 1975) broke into the Top 25 of Billboard'''s country singles chart in early 1976. Their next single, "The Door Is Always Open", became their first No. 1 hit in July. Their peak run garnered nearly one dozen Top 10 singles, including two more No. 1 hits - "Tear Time" (1978) and "Golden Tears" (1979).

Rowland disbanded the trio briefly during the early 1980s to try a solo career, releasing an album entitled (appropriately) Sugar Free and charting two singles of his own. Powell also charted two singles on RCA as a soloist, and later went on to host the TV series Nashville on the Road''. Rowland later reformed the trio with two new sets of "Sugar" partners: Cindy Smith and Lisa Alvey, followed by Regina Leigh and Lori Mason. However, these second-era trios failed to gain the popularity the original trios had in the 1970s and the group disbanded for good after only minimal success. In 1997, former Sugar member Leigh formed the short-lived country duo Regina Regina with partner Regina Nicks.

On November 1, 2018, Rowland died due to complications from a stroke in his Nashville home at the age of 74.

Discography

Albums

Dave Rowland solo albums

Singles

Dave Rowland solo singles

Sue Powell solo singles

Notes

Awards 

|+ Country Music Association
|-
| 1976
| "The Door Is Always Open" - RCA
| Single of the Year
| 
| Dave Rowland, Jackie Frantz, Vicki Hackeman
|-
| 1976
| Dave & Sugar
|Vocal Group of the Year
| 
| Dave Rowland, Jackie Frantz, Vicki Hackeman
|-
| 1977
| Dave & Sugar
|Vocal Group of the Year
| 
| Dave Rowland, Sue Powell, Vicki Hackeman
|-
| 1978
| Dave & Sugar
| Vocal Group of the Year
| 
| Dave Rowland, Sue Powell, Etta Britt (as M.Dean)
|-
| 1979
| Dave & Sugar
| Vocal Group of the Year
| 
| Dave Rowland, Sue Powell, Etta Britt

References

American country music groups
RCA Records artists
Elektra Records artists
American musical trios